Iniakuk Lake is located on the southern edge of the Brooks Range,  west of Bettles, Alaska. This lake drains into the Iniakuk River, from which the lake received its name.

References

Brooks Range
Lakes of Alaska
Bodies of water of Yukon–Koyukuk Census Area, Alaska